Flóra Molnár (born 2 March 1998) is a Hungarian swimmer. She competed in the women's 50 metre freestyle event at the 2016 Summer Olympics. She finished in 25th place in the heats with a time of 25.07 and she did not advance to the semi-finals.

References

External links
 

1998 births
Living people
Hungarian female swimmers
Olympic swimmers of Hungary
Swimmers at the 2016 Summer Olympics
Place of birth missing (living people)
Hungarian female freestyle swimmers
20th-century Hungarian women
21st-century Hungarian women